Joseph R. Bowen (April 22, 1950 – March 8, 2022) was an American politician from Kentucky.

Bowen was born in Evansville, Indiana and graduated from the Daviess County High School in Owensboro, Kentucky in 1968. He then graduated from University of Kentucky, in 1972, with a bachelor's degree in business administration. He worked for his family's business, the Bowen Tire Company, in Owensboro.

Bowen was first elected to the Kentucky House of Representatives, representing the 13th district as a Republican from 2005 until 2007. He was defeated for re-election in 2006 by Democrat Jim Glenn. He was then a member of the Kentucky State Senate from the 8th District, from 2011 to 2019.

Bowen did not seek re-election in 2018, citing health issues as well as his support for term limits. He died at a hospital in Lexington, Kentucky on March 8, 2022, at the age of 71, from complications of a heart attack he had the previous week.

References

1950 births
2022 deaths
20th-century American businesspeople
21st-century American businesspeople
21st-century American politicians
Businesspeople from Kentucky
Republican Party Kentucky state senators
Republican Party members of the Kentucky House of Representatives
Politicians from Evansville, Indiana
Politicians from Owensboro, Kentucky
University of Kentucky alumni